São Miguel das Missões is a municipality in Rio Grande do Sul state, southern Brazil. Important 17th century Spanish Jesuit mission ruins are located in the municipality. San Miguel Mission is within Santo Ângelo Microregion, and the Riograndense Northwest Mesoregion.

Mission São Miguel das Missões

The town grew around the Spanish colonial Jesuit Reduction, Mission San Miguel Arcángel, founded in 1632. After becoming part of Brazil it was renamed Mission São Miguel das Missões.

In 1984 Mission São Miguel das Missões was one of four sites of Jesuit reductions in Argentina and one in Brazil to be declared  by UNESCO the  World Heritage Sites.

Museum

The Mission Museum (Museu das Missões) is a history museum located in São Miguel Mission.

The creation of the museum was one of the first initiatives of the Office of Historical and Artistic Heritage, today IPHAN.   In 1937 the SPHAN was created and in the same year, the architect Lucio Costa was sent to Rio Grande do Sul to analyze the remains of the ruins of the Seven Peoples of the Missions, and propose measures. One of his proposals was to create a museum to house the statues missionaries  dispersed throughout the region. In 1938, the remnants of the town of San Miguel and the museum building were listed as National Heritage, and in 1940, the Museum of the Missions was officially established.

Between 1938 and 1940, the architect Lucas Mayerhofer directed the stabilization works in the mission Church of San Miguel, the construction of the museum building, and was in charge of gathering the works of statuary.

Currently listed in the museum's collection are religious images from the time of installation of the Jesuit missions in the region.

See also 

Governorate of Paraguay
 Misiones Orientales
Governorate of the Río de la Plata
Viceroyalty of the Río de la Plata

References

External links

Explore the Jesuit Missions of the Guaranis: Ruins of São Miguel das Missões in the UNESCO collection on Google Arts and Culture

Municipalities in Rio Grande do Sul
Jesuit Missions of the Guaranis
Spanish missions in Brazil
Colonial Brazil
1632 establishments in the Viceroyalty of Peru
1767 disestablishments in the Viceroyalty of Peru
Governorate of the Río de la Plata